Gibi ASMR (born December 19, 1994) is an American ASMR performer, YouTube personality, Twitch streamer, and cosplayer.

Early life 
Gibi has a background in theater and film, and graduated with the class of 2017 from Northwestern University's School of Communication with a Bachelor of Science in Film.

Career 
During the early years of ASMR content, Gibi was a high school sophomore with anxiety and insomnia when YouTube's recommendation algorithm introduced her to the genre. After watching and listening to ASMR for years, Gibi created her YouTube channel in June 2016, before her senior year of college. That summer, she began cosplaying and attending anime conventions; inspired by earlier creators, she incorporated these interests into role-play ASMR videos, which feature both existing and original characters. From the start, Gibi intended to treat video-making as a full-time job, which included taking her winter quarter off from college to focus on production. Within six months of graduating, she was earning enough to create videos full-time, and after a year reached one million subscribers.

At the suggestion of her editor, Gibi created her Twitch channel in 2017, on which she streams ASMR and plays video games. In 2019, she hosted a web miniseries by Rooster Teeth called Encounter Culture.

Polydor Records contacted Gibi in 2019 and asked if she would perform an ASMR read-through of Billie Eilish's album, When We All Fall Asleep, Where Do We Go?. Gibi recorded the project for free; since its upload it has amassed over 3 million views. That summer, Gibi was hired to star in Reese The Movie: A Movie About Reese, an official feature-length ASMR project about Reese's Peanut Butter Cups.

Reception 
Gibi is considered one of YouTube's top ASMR creators. Her videos have been recommended by authors for Bustle, Den of Geek, Heavy.com, and Insider. Writing for The New York Times Magazine, Jamie Lauren Keiles called Gibi "the LeBron James of touching stuff," and wrote favorably of her genuine online persona.

Personal life 
Gibi takes strict privacy precautions for the sake of friends and family. In the past, she refrained from sharing her relationship status or city of residence. In 2019, Gibi married her husband, Ben, whom she met at Northwestern and today manages her business affairs. The couple relocated in January 2020, revealing their former residence was in a suburb of Chicago. In November 2020, Gibi revealed her first name as Gina.

References

External links 
 Official site
 Gibi's channel on YouTube
Gibi's channel on Twitch
 Gibi ASMR on Spotify
 Gibi ASMR on Twitter

1994 births
Living people
American YouTubers
Cosplayers
Practitioners of autonomous sensory meridian response
Twitch (service) streamers